This is a list of Dutch television related events from 1978.

Events
22 February - Harmony are selected to represent Netherlands at the 1978 Eurovision Song Contest with their song "'t Is OK". They are selected to be the twenty-third Dutch Eurovision entry during Nationaal Songfestival held at Congresgebouw in The Hague.

Debuts

Television shows

1950s
NOS Journaal (1956–present)
Pipo de Clown (1958–present)

1970s
Sesamstraat (1976–present)

Ending this year

Births
24 October - Christophe Haddad, Belgian-born actor

Deaths